Volochanka is a rural locality (a settlement) under the administrative jurisdiction of the district town of Dudinka in Taymyrsky Dolgano-Nenetsky District of Krasnoyarsk Krai, Russia. It is located on the Kheta River in the Taymyr Peninsula. Population: 530 people (2010 est.).

History
In 1932, native leaders of three nationalities, including the Dolgan and Yakuts, started a civil uprising in Volochanka against the Bolsheviks; twenty Party workers were killed and many others wounded in the event.

Demographics
The inhabitants include representatives of Taymyr, Dolgans, and Nganasan indigenous peoples.

Infrastructure
The settlement has a boarding school, kindergarten, district hospital, rural cultural center, a library, a branch of the Federal Postal Service, Department of "Telecommunications", and weather station.

References

External links
Information about Volochanka 

Rural localities in Krasnoyarsk Krai
Populated places of Arctic Russia
Taymyrsky Dolgano-Nenetsky District